Wu Kau Tang is an area in Northeast New Territories, Hong Kong. It is administratively part of North District and is enclosed by Plover Cove Country Park on all sides. It is the starting point of the Wu Kau Tang Country Trail and the Plover Cove Reservoir Country Trail.

Originally named "Wu Kau Tin", the area comprises several villages, including Lo Wai, Ho Pui, Leng Pui, San Uk Ha, Tin Sum and Sam Ka Tsuen.

Administration
Wu Kau Tang is a recognized village under the New Territories Small House Policy. For electoral purposes, Wu Kau Tang is part of the Sha Ta constituency of the North District Council. It is currently represented by Ko Wai-kei, who was elected in the local elections.

History
In 1669, the coastal ban imposed by the Great Clearance was lifted and the Kangxi Emperor ordered the villages to return to their original sites. According to an official document, Wu Kau Tang was one of the villages which returned and was re-established.

At the time of the 1911 census, the population of Wu Kau Tang was 423. The number of males was 165.

Geography
Wu Kau Tang is surrounded by several hills: Fan Kei Tok to the north, Tiu Tang Lung to the northeast, Ma Tau Fung to the south and Sam Tam Lo to the west.

Fauna
Wu Kau Tang has been described as particularly rich in butterflies, with 137 species observed. The Hong Kong Paradise Fish can also be found in the area.

See also
 List of villages in Hong Kong
 Bride's Pool
 Kau Tam Tso
 Sham Chung

References

External links

 Delineation of area of existing village Wu Kau Tang (Sha Tau Kok) for election of resident representative (2019 to 2022)
 

North District, Hong Kong
Villages in North District, Hong Kong